In analytic number theory, the Dickman function or Dickman–de Bruijn function ρ is a special function used to estimate the proportion of smooth numbers up to a given bound.
It was first studied by actuary Karl Dickman, who defined it in his only mathematical publication, which is not easily available, and  later studied by the Dutch mathematician Nicolaas Govert de Bruijn.

Definition
The Dickman–de Bruijn function  is a continuous function that satisfies the delay differential equation

with initial conditions  for 0 ≤ u ≤ 1.

Properties 
Dickman proved that, when  is fixed, we have

where  is the number of y-smooth (or y-friable) integers below x.

in big O notation.

Applications

The main purpose of the Dickman–de Bruijn function is to estimate the frequency of smooth numbers at a given size. This can be used to optimize various number-theoretical algorithms such as P-1 factoring and can be useful of its own right.

It can be shown using  that

The Golomb–Dickman constant has an alternate definition in terms of the Dickman–de Bruijn function.

Estimation
A first approximation might be  A better estimate is

where Ei is the exponential integral and ξ is the positive root of

A simple upper bound is

Computation
For each interval [n − 1, n] with n an integer, there is an analytic function  such that .  For 0 ≤ u ≤ 1, . For 1 ≤ u ≤ 2, . For 2 ≤ u ≤ 3,

with Li2 the dilogarithm. Other  can be calculated using infinite series.

An alternate method is computing lower and upper bounds with the trapezoidal rule; a mesh of progressively finer sizes allows for arbitrary accuracy. For high precision calculations (hundreds of digits), a recursive series expansion about the midpoints of the intervals is superior.

Extension
This function is used to estimate a function  similar to de Bruijn's, but counting the number of y-smooth integers with at most one prime factor greater than z. Then

See also
Golomb–Dickman constant

References

Further reading
 
 
 

Analytic number theory
Special functions